Riphah International University (رفاہ انٹرنیشنل یونیورسٹی) is a private university in Pakistan, chartered by the Federal Government of Pakistan in 2002. 

It is sponsored by the not-for-profit Islamic International Medical College Trust (IIMCT). The first project of the IIMCT was the Islamic International Medical College in Rawalpindi, established in 1996 by its founding Managing Trustee, Zulfiqar Ali Khan. The university has 14 constituent units and an overseas project, the RAK College of Dental Sciences, in the United Arab Emirates. The university is also working towards the establishment of a campus in Mauritius.

Governance
The President of Pakistan is the Patron of the University. Zulfiqar Ali Khan was the Founding Chancellor and Hassan Muhammad Khan is the Pro-Chancellor of the University. Educationist Anis Ahmad is the Founding Vice-Chancellor of the University. The Board of Governors and the Academic Council are the highest policy-making bodies of the University. The Vice Chancellor is the Chief Executive and Academic Officer of the University.

Campuses
The 14 constituent campuses of the university include:

Main Campus, Sector I-14, Islamabad
City Campus - I, G-7/4, 7th Avenue, Islamabad
City Campus - II, Evacuee Trust Complex, Islamabad
WISH Campus, H-8, Islamabad
Al-Mizan Campus, Rawalpindi
Riphah International University Lahore, Raiwind Road
QIE Campus, Lahore
Riphah International University Faisalabad
RAK College of Dental Sciences, Ras Al-Khaimah, UAE

Faculties
The university consists of several colleges with undergraduate, graduate, and postgraduate programmes:
Islamic International Dental College
Islamic International Engineering College
Islamic International Medical College
Riphah College of Rehabilitation Sciences
Riphah Institute of Pharmaceutical Sciences
Riphah Institute of Media Sciences
Faculty of Computing
Riphah Center of Islamic Business
Riphah Institute of Informatics
Riphah School of Leadership
Riphah Institute of Systems Engineering
Faculty of Basic Sciences
Faculty of Social Sciences & Humanities
Riphah Institute of Public Policy
Riphah College of Veterinary Sciences (RCVetS), established in 2012. The college offers a five years Doctor of Veterinary Medicine (DVM) degree besides other short courses, and is accredited by the Pakistan Veterinary Medical Council (PVMC) and Higher Education Commission of Pakistan (HEC).

University ranking and quality certification 
Riphah International University, Islamabad was included in "W Category" universities by the Higher Education Commission (HEC) of Pakistan in 2005 and was later included in the top five universities in the private sector, qualifying to receive research grants from the Government of Pakistan through the HEC. Subsequently, Riphah university ranked in the sixth position among private and public sector national universities of medium size with a quality score of 9.70 on the basis of quality assurance and research output criteria set by the HEC. Further, the Quality Enhancement Cell of the University was given first position among the private sector "W Category" universities of Pakistan according to the score card formulated by the HEC. Riphah was the first university in Pakistan to be certified under ISO 9001:2008 Standard by the UK based Lloyd's Register, one of the top five global independent risk management and safety assurance organizations.

Riphah College of Science and Technology's Electrical Engineering program is accredited by the Pakistan Engineering Council (PEC).

Quality Enhancement Cell
The Quality Enhancement Cell was established at Riphah International University in October 2009 by the HEC, with a mandate to monitor the quality of education. It has since been declared one of the best Quality Enhancement Cells in Pakistan by the HEC.

References

External links
 

Educational institutions established in 2002
2002 establishments in Pakistan
Universities and colleges in Islamabad
Private universities and colleges in Pakistan
Islamabad Capital Territory
Pakistan–Saudi Arabia relations
Islamic universities and colleges in Pakistan